Cinthya Karina Orozco Membreño (born 1 January 1994) is a Nicaraguan footballer who plays as a midfielder for the Nicaragua women's national team.

Early life
Orozco was born in Matagalpa.

International career
Orozco capped for Nicaragua at senior level during two CONCACAF Women's Championship qualifications (2010 and 2018), two Central American and Caribbean Games editions (2010 and 2014), the 2012 CONCACAF Women's Olympic Qualifying Tournament qualification and the 2013 Central American Games.

References 

1994 births
Living people
People from Matagalpa Department
Nicaraguan women's footballers
Women's association football midfielders
Nicaragua women's international footballers
Central American Games silver medalists for Nicaragua
Central American Games medalists in football